Beeson is a surname. Notable people with the surname include:

Chalkley Beeson (1848–1912), sheriff of Dodge City, Kansas and proprietor of the Long Branch Saloon
Charles Beeson (1957–2021), British television director
Charles H. Beeson (1870–1949), American classical scholar
Clare-Marie Beeson (born 1948), New Zealand born judge in the Hong Kong judiciary
Cyril Beeson (1889–1975), English entomologist and horologist
Diana Danielle (Diana Danielle Danny Beeson, born 1991), American-Malaysian actress
Duane Beeson (1921–1947), American fighter ace in World War II
Henry White Beeson (1791–1863), member of the U.S. House of Representatives
Jack Beeson (1921–2010), American composer
John Beeson (1803–1889), British-American abolitionist and supporter of Native American rights
Marc Beeson (born 1954), American country music singer and songwriter
Mark Beeson (born 1952), British professor in Political Science and International Relations at the University of Western Australia
Paul Beeson (1921–2001), British cinematographer
Paul Bruce Beeson (1908–2006), American physician
Robert Beeson, American music executive
Ronald Beeson (1936–1995), English cricketer
Terry Beeson (born 1955), former American football linebacker
Trevor Beeson (born 1926), English priest and writer, Dean of Winchester 1987–96
Loren Beeson (born 1992), American novelist